Gudur mandal is one of the 34 mandals in Tirupati district of the state of Andhra Pradesh, India. Its headquarters are located at Gudur. The mandal is situated on the coast of Bay of Bengal, bounded by Sydapuram, Manubolu, Balayapalle, Ojili and Chillakur mandals. It is a part of Gudur revenue division.

Demographics 

 census, the mandal had a population of 116,330. The total population constitute, 57,680 males and 58,650 females —a sex ratio of 1017 females per 1000 males. 11,659 children are in the age group of 0–6 years, of which 5,942 are boys and 5,717 are girls —a ratio of 962 per 1000. The average literacy rate stands at 71.85% with 75,205 literates.

Towns and villages 

Chennuru – II is the most populated and Reddigunta is the least populated settlement in the mandal.  census, the mandal has 23 settlements, that includes the following towns and villages:

Sources:
 Census India 2011 (sub districts)
 Revenue Department of AP

References

Mandals in Tirupati district